Bredäng metro station is a station on the red line of the Stockholm metro, located in the district of Bredäng. The station was opened on  16 May 1965 as part of the extension from Örnsberg to Sätra.

References

Red line (Stockholm metro) stations
Railway stations opened in 1965